Barygenys cheesmanae is a species of frogs in the family Microhylidae. It is endemic to eastern New Guinea and is only known from Mount Tafa in Central Province, Papua New Guinea. The specific name cheesmanae honors Lucy Evelyn Cheesman, an English entomologist, explorer, curator at London Zoo, and collector of the holotype. Common name Cheesman's Papua frog has been coined for this species.

Description
It has a globose body, a narrow head with pointed snout, and very short hind limbs. The snout bears three conspicuous vertical ridges. The tympanum is present but indistinct; a weakly developed supratympanic fold is present. The fingers are short, broad at the base, and tapering to narrowly rounded tips. The toe tips are rounded, without terminal grooves or dilations. No webbing is present. The dorsal groundcolor varies from brownish yellow to pale brown to deep red-brown. A number of more or less black spots are irregularly scattered on the dorsum. Some pink spots may also be present. The hind limbs are darker and may have some reddish color. The lower surfaces vary from dirty yellow to brown.

Habitat and conservation
Its ecology is poorly known, but it is probably a secretive and terrestrial species; the species describer noted this frog as living in holes in the ground. Males call throughout the day. Development is presumably direct (i.e, there is no free-living larval stage). There are no known threats to this species that is considered to live in a remote area. It is not known to occur in any protected areas.

References

cheesmanae
Amphibians of New Guinea
Amphibians of Papua New Guinea
Endemic fauna of New Guinea
Endemic fauna of Papua New Guinea
Amphibians described in 1936
Taxa named by Hampton Wildman Parker
Taxonomy articles created by Polbot